Francis Henry Wilson (February 11, 1844 – September 25, 1910) was a U.S. Representative from New York.

Born in Clinton, New York, Wilson lived in Utica, New York, until ten years of age, when he moved with his parents to the Westmoreland farm.
He attended the district school, Dwight's Preparatory School, Clinton, New York, and was graduated from Yale College in 1867.
He taught in a preparatory school four years.
He was graduated from the Columbia College Law School, New York City, in 1875.
He was admitted to the bar in 1882 and commenced practice in New York City.
He was one of the founders of the Union League Club and its president in 1888 and 1889.

Wilson was elected as a Republican to the Fifty-fourth and Fifty-fifth Congresses and served from March 4, 1895, to September 30, 1897, when he resigned to become postmaster.
He was appointed postmaster of Brooklyn, New York, and served from October 1897 until December 1901.
He resumed the practice of law.
He died in Brooklyn, New York, September 25, 1910.
He was interred in Greenwood Cemetery.

Sources

1844 births
1910 deaths
Burials at Green-Wood Cemetery
Yale College alumni
Columbia Law School alumni
Republican Party members of the United States House of Representatives from New York (state)
People from Clinton, Oneida County, New York
19th-century American politicians